My Strange Hero is a South Korean television series starring Yoo Seung-ho, Jo Bo-ah, and Kwak Dong-yeon. It aired on SBS's Mondays and Tuesdays at 22:00 (KST) from December 10, 2018 to February 4, 2019.

Synopsis
In 2009, Kang Bok-soo is enrolled as a junior at Seolsong High, a prestigious private high school known for its discriminatory practice of segregating students based on their grades and social status. Bok-soo is a routine troublemaker who scores poorly in tests, but he is also popular for being a bully hunter. He dates the school's smartest student, Son Soo-jung, and is also best friends with Oh Se-ho, the awkward son of the school's abusive board chairwoman, Lim Se-gyeong. Soo-jung has long been hiding the fact that she is poor, but her background is suddenly outed to the school a day after she discloses it to Bok-soo, causing her to believe that he cares for her out of simple pity. When she heads to the roof to mourn, she hears Bok-soo and Se-ho having an argument, ending with the latter falling. Se-ho survives the incident and testifies that Bok-soo pushed him. Soo-jung, still heartbroken by Bok-soo's apparent betrayal, testifies against him as well, leading to his expulsion from Seolsong.

Nine years later, Bok-soo is working at Your Request, a general service company. Soo-jung is struggling to receive a promotion as permanent teacher at Seolsong and unwittingly scammed to pay a hefty sum of money to become one. She is currently counseling Oh Young-min, a troubled student of Ivy, the school's highest-ranked class. She talks down Young-min when he attempts to commit suicide by jumping into the Han River, only to end up falling down with him. Bok-soo, who happens to be standing nearby, saves her. His heroic action forces Se-ho, recently promoted to become Seolsong's board chairman, to readmit Bok-soo into the school and appease public opinion. Bok-soo enters Wildflower, the school's lowest-ranked class. Se-ho pulls some strings to promote Soo-jung as permanent teacher and gives her the job to mentor Wildflower.

Bok-soo devises a plan to take revenge against Seolsong, and Se-ho in particular, for the lies that caused his expulsion. Though initially chilly, Bok-soo rekindles his relationship with Soo-jung when they learn that their grudge was driven by a series of misunderstandings: Se-ho was the one who gossiped Soo-jung's background and framed Bok-soo into playing the part of his rooftop fall, which was actually a suicide attempt. Se-ho has long been in love with Soo-jung and framed Bok-soo precisely so they would split. When Soo-jung confronts him about this, he openly admits his actions and warns her that, for rejecting him, he would make her and Bok-soo's lives miserable. Aided by his friends, Bok-soo slowly dismantles the corrupt atmosphere of Seolsong. In the process, they have to face the school's entire upper management, all of whom want to preserve the status quo. Upon collecting enough evidences, Bok-soo uploads a YouTube video containing documents that implicate Seolsong's corruption.

The ensuing scrutiny convinces Se-gyeong to depose her son and engineer a scapegoat so the school's reputation could be protected. Se-ho, having had a change of heart and sick of being mistreated by his mother, forms an alliance with Bok-soo to further scrutinize Seolsong and bring them to court. Bok-soo publicizes Se-gyeong's plan to turn Seolsong into a corporation, and Soo-jung further testifies against her at the cost of her job. Se-ho, meanwhile, admits the truth about his suicide attempt. Not willing to surrender, Se-gyeong blackmails Se-ho into becoming a scapegoat and plans to close Seolsong. Bok-soo, Soo-jung, their friends, and the teachers band together to prevent her from entering the school long enough until the police arrive to arrest her, having been tipped by Se-ho regarding his mother's crimes.

In the aftermath of Se-gyeong's arrest, Seolsong becomes a public school. Se-ho moves to the United States to recover, while Bok-soo receives his high school diploma a year later. Four years later, Bok-soo is teaching at Seolsong, while Soo-jung finally becomes a teacher through legitimate means.

Cast

Main
 Yoo Seung-ho as Kang Bok-soo
A rowdy young man who got expelled from Seolsong High for a crime he was falsely accused of. Nine years later, he is invited to attend the school again, despite being 25 years old, and plans to take revenge by reforming the school establishment. His lack of a high school diploma closes the door to many job opportunities for him, making him rather bitter, but Bok-soo possesses a strong sense of justice and is eager to fix other people's problems. 
 Jo Bo-ah as Son Soo-jung
Nine years ago, Soo-jung was Seolsong's smartest student and Bok-soo's girlfriend. However, their relationship fell apart when she thought he betrayed her by exposing her biggest secret: poverty. Soo-jung responded in kind and told the investigators of Se-ho's accident what she heard, when she could have just lied, sealing the decision to expel Bok-soo from Seolsong. Since then, Soo-jung has been living in regret, but the memory of the betrayal prevents her from reconciling with Bok-soo until years later. Though she appears wholesome, Soo-jung is headstrong and uses crude language, which Bok-soo brands "two-faced". Soo-jung's dream is to become a teacher, something that keeps her motivated throughout her rough life.
 Kwak Dong-yeon as Oh Se-ho
When he first enrolled, Se-ho was the awkward son of Seolsong's ruthless chairwoman and led an unhappy life. His mother is shamelessly abusive and deadbeat, something that traumatized him for life. He is jealous of Bok-soo for having a loving family and dating the girl Se-ho has a crush on. He eventually attempted suicide, but survived and framed Bok-soo at his mother's urging. Nine years later, Se-ho takes over as Seolsong's chairman.

Supporting

Your Request staff
 Kim Dong-young as Lee Kyung-hyun
Bok-soo's childhood friend who graduated from Seolsong and the CEO of Your Request. He is fiercely loyal to Bok-soo and helps him in his revenge plan against Seolsong. Kyung-hyun eventually develops a relationship with Min-ji, though his thick attitude exasperates her.
 Park Ah-in as Yang Min-ji
Min-ji was initially one of Bok-soo's many admirers back at Seolsong, but she showed her depth when she became one of the only three people from school who defended him when he was accused of harming Se-ho. Min-ji's crush on Bok-soo persists nine years later, even after Bok-soo repeatedly told her that he only sees her as a friend. Min-ji is initially hostile at Soo-jung for betraying Bok-soo when he needed her most, but grows to accept her as his girlfriend. She slowly moves on from her crush and falls in love with Kyung-hyun.

People around Bok-soo
 Kim Mi-kyung as Lee Jung-sun
Bok-soo's mother who runs a restaurant called Sojeonggak. She is unfailingly kind and always sees the best of everyone.
 Kim Jae-hwa as Kang So-jung 
Bok-soo's much older sister who won the gold medal in sepak takraw during the 2002 Asian Games. She spoils In-ho very much and is fooled into thinking that he is a bright student, when his scores are rather poor. She is furious upon learning the truth, but is convinced by Soo-jung to forgive him.
 Choi Won-hong as Kang In-ho
So-jung's son and Bok-soo's nephew. He is a shy nerd who lies about his poor grades to his mother ever since he entered Seolsong. Until Bok-soo enters his class, In-ho's attitude makes him a frequent target of bullying. He supports Bok-soo's and Soo-jung's relationship and calls the latter "aunt", much to her embarrassment.

People around Soo-jung
 Kim Young-ok as Lee Sun-hye
Soo-jung's sickly paternal grandmother and the only family she has left, after her mother died and her father left. The cost for her treatment is one of Soo-jung's motivations to apply as a teacher.
 Joel Roberts as Shim-lan
An African American expatriate who works in a convenience store Soo-jung frequents.

People around Se-ho
 Kim Yeo-jin as Lim Se-gyeong
Se-ho's abusive mother. She inherited the position as board chairwoman of Seolsong after her husband left her. Se-ho's issue with his mother is the catalyst that makes him a ruthless person as an adult. She was the one who persuaded Se-ho to frame Bok-soo for his suicide attempt. Later in the series, she becomes the primary antagonist to Bok-soo's and Soo-jung's attempt to reform the school. In the penultimate episode, she gets arrested for violating the Additional Law of Specific Crimes by committing embezzlement and bribery. Then, in the finale, she gets sentenced to life imprisonment.
 Lee Seung-hyung as Mr. Yoo
Se-ho's secretary. While investigating Se-ho, Bok-soo finds out that he is gay.

Seolsong School students
 Yeon Joon-seok as Oh Young-min
A student from Ivy class whose suicide attempt, caused by the pressure of having the lowest score in class, begins a chain of events leading to Bok-soo entering Seolsong. He eventually transfers to Wildflower class and has a much happier time there.
 Lee Kang-min as Yoon Seung-woo
A brooding student from Wildflower class who works as a night club bartender. He bullies In-ho until Bok-soo comes, after which his attitude changes. He falls in love with Soo-jung and warns Bok-soo that if he is not careful, he will steal her from him. 
 Yoo Seon-ho as Yoo Shi-on
Seung-woo's friend and one of the students who bully In-ho until Bok-soo is invited to the class.
 Oh Hee-joon as Kim Jae-yoon
 Jang Dong-joo as Lee Chae-min
A student from Ivy class who frequently bullies Wildflower class. Though he is nominally Seolsong's smartest student, he cheats his way out of tests, as his mother is dealing with the principal to get the answer sheets. 
 Kim Da-ye as Gye So-ra
 Hong Seung-beom as Choi Do-hyun

Seolsong School staff
 Chun Ho-jin as Teacher Park Dong-joon
The head of the school staff who teaches mathematics. He believes Bok-soo's innocence regarding Se-ho's incident. He is close to Bok-soo and views him as a surrogate son.
 Jo Hyun-sik as Ma Young-joon
English teacher. Nine years ago, Bok-soo saved him from bullies, making him revere Bok-soo.
 Um Hyo-sup as Kim Kwi-chang 
Seolsong's principal. Like most of the upper management, he is corrupt and is bribed by the wealthier students' parents to leak test answer sheets.
 Kim Kwang-kyu as Song Yoo-taek 
The grumpy vice principal responsible for overseeing the teachers' conduct.
 Kim Do-yeon as Hong Jung-hye
Korean teacher.
 Park Kyung-hye as Jang Ji-hyun
Ethics teacher.
 Jang Won-young as Kim Guk-hyun
Student manager.
 Jung Hee as Dong Hee
Physical education teacher.
 Shin Dam-soo as Kim Myung-ho
Administrative manager. He resigns at the start of the series after scamming many people, including Soo-jung, who want to buy their way into the permanent teacher position.
 Chae Song-ah as Park Min-hee
Physics teacher. 
 Kwon Hyuk as Sports Teacher

Parents of Seolsong School's students
 Jeon Soo-kyeong as Chae-min's mother
 Kim Young-sun as Young-min's mother

Others
 Seo Hye-won as Kim Bo-kyung

Special appearances
 Kim Jin-woo as groom (Ep. 1)
 Lee Chae-young as bride (Ep. 1)
 Hwang Bo-ra as woman dumped via Bok-soo (Ep. 2, 3)
 Kim Ji-min as a rich lady and a Your Request client (Ep. 4)
 Lee Jung-eun as the mother of a Your Request client (Ep. 4)

Production
The first script reading took place on October 8, 2018 at SBS Ilsan Production Studios in Goyang, Gyeonggi Province, South Korea. The drama serves as a reunion project for Jo Bo-ah and Joel Roberts who both starred in the 2018 drama Goodbye to Goodbye.

Original soundtrack

Part 1

Part 2

Part 3

Part 4

Part 5

Part 6

Part 7

Part 8

Part 9

Ratings
 In this table,  represent the lowest ratings and  represent the highest ratings.
 NR denotes that the drama did not rank in the top 20 daily programs on that date.
 N/A denotes that the rating is not known.

Notes

References

External links
  
 
 

Seoul Broadcasting System television dramas
Korean-language television shows
2018 South Korean television series debuts
2019 South Korean television series endings
South Korean romantic comedy television series